The 2007–08 Copa del Rey was the 106th staging of the Copa del Rey.

The competition started on 29 August 2007 and concluded on 16 April 2008 with the final, held at the Vicente Calderón Stadium in Madrid, in which Valencia lifted the trophy for the seventh time in their history with a 3–1 victory over Getafe, who were also beaten finalists a year earlier. The cup holders had been Sevilla, but they were eliminated in the round of 16.

First round

Second round

Third round

Final phase 
Team listed first home in first leg

Quarter-finals 

|}

Semi-finals 

|}

First leg

Second leg 

Getafe go to the final 4–2 on aggregate

Valencia go to the final 4–3 on aggregate

Final

Top goalscorers

External links 
 Copa del Rey 2007/2008 at the LFP
 Copa del Rey 2007/2008 at the Marca.com

2007-08
1